Quiet Moments may refer to:

Music

Albums
 Quiet Moments (album) or the title song, by Lycia, 2013
 Quiet Moments, by Val Doonican, 1981
 Quiet Moments, by Vasco Martins, 1995

Songs
 "Quiet Moments", by Chris de Burgh from Crusader
 "Quiet Moments", by Lonnie Liston Smith
 "Quiet Moments", by Tim
 "Quiet Moments", from the soundtrack of Seven Years in Tibet

Other uses
 Quiet Moments, a book of photographs by Daryl Hawk
 Quiet Moments, a program broadcast by Sonshine Media Network International